Pavel Ermolinskij (born 25 January 1987) is an Icelandic basketball coach and former player of Ukrainian descent, a member of the Icelandic national team. He has won the Icelandic championship with KR seven times, in 2011 and 2014–2019. He played in the Spanish Liga ACB for several seasons, winning the Spanish King's Cup in 2005.

Early life
Pavel was born in Kiev in the Soviet Union to Soviet national basketball team player Alexander Ermolinskij. He emigrated to Iceland with his family in 1992, at the age of 5, when his father signed with Skallagrímur in Borgarnes.

Playing career

Club career
Pavel first appeared in a Úrvalsdeild karla game on 6 March 1998, at the age of only 11, when his father and head coach of Körfuknattleiksfélag ÍA, Alexander Ermolinskij, selected him for the 10-man squad against Njarðvík. At the time there were no rules regarding minimum age of players in the league.

His next taste of the senior team was with Skallagrímur during the 2001–02 season when he appeared in 15 games, averaging 1.8 points per game.

During the 2014-2015 season, Pavel averaged a triple-double in the Úrvalsdeild with 13.3 points, 10.5 rebounds and 10.3 assists per game in 15 regular season games.

Pavel led the Úrvalsdeild karla in assists during the 2017-2018 season. On April 28, 2018, he won his sixth Icelandic championship after KR defeated Tindastóll in the Úrvalsdeild finals. It was the eighteenth straight playoffs series he won in the Úrvalsdeild playoffs. After sitting out the first three games of the 2018–2019 season, Pavel resumed training with KR in end of October. On 4 May 2019 he won his 7th national championship after KR beat ÍR in the Úrvalsdeild finals 3–2.

On 13 August 2019, Pavel signed a 2-year contract with KR's Reykjavík rivals Valur. He started the season strong, with big fourth quarter performances in victories against Fjölnir and Þór Þorlákshöfn. On 25 October, he scored the game winning three pointer with 5 seconds left in an overtime victory against Tindastóll. On 5 January 2020, Pavel was 1 assist shy of the Úrvalsdeild record when he handed out 17 assists in a victory against Fjölnir.

On 6 May 2022, he played his 100th Úrvalsdeild playoffs game when Valur defeated Tindastóll in game one of the 2022 Úrvalsdeild finals. On 18 May 2022, he won his eight national championship after Valur defeated Tindastóll in the Úrvalsdeild finals.

On 22 August 2022, Pavel announced he was leaving Valur.

In October 2022, Pavel announced his retirement from playing.

National team career
Pavel has played with the Icelandic national basketball team since 2004 and participated in EuroBasket 2015 and EuroBasket 2017.

Coaching career
Pavel served as an assistant coach for Valur during the 2021–22 season.

On 14 January 2023, he was hired as the head coach of Tindastóll, replacing Vladimir Anzulović.

Honours

Iceland

Club
Icelandic Champion (7): 2011, 2014, 2015, 2016, 2017, 2018, 2019, 2022
Icelandic Cup (3): 2011, 2016, 2017
Icelandic Super Cup (2): 2014, 2015
Icelandic Company Cup: 2014

Individual
Úrvalsdeild Domestic Player of the Year (2): 2011, 2015
Úrvalsdeild Domestic All-First Team (4): 2011, 2014–2016
Icelandic Cup MVP: 2011

Spain

Club
Spanish King's Cup: 2005

References

External links
Pavel Ermolinskij 1997-2003 Úrvalsdeild stats at kki.is
Pavel Ermolinskij 2008-present Úrvalsdeild stats at kki.is
Basketligan statistics at basketliganherr.se

1987 births
Living people
Baloncesto Málaga players
CB Axarquía players
Pavel Ermolinskij
Pavel Ermolinskij
Pavel Ermolinskij
Pavel Ermolinskij
Pavel Ermolinskij
Pavel Ermolinskij
Pavel Ermolinskij
JA Vichy players
Pavel Ermolinskij
Liga ACB players
Norrköping Dolphins players
Point guards
Pavel Ermolinskij
Basketball players from Kyiv
Sundsvall Dragons players
UB La Palma players
Ukrainian emigrants to Iceland
Pavel Ermolinskij
Pavel Ermolinskij